The bicycle industry or cycling industry can broadly be defined as the industry concerned with bicycles and cycling. It includes at least bicycle manufacturers, part or component manufacturers, and accessory manufacturers. It can also include distributors, retailers, bicycle organizations, bicycle event promoters, and bicycle related service providers.

The Global Bicycle Industry generates sales for over $45 bn in 2017 and is forecasted, according to analyst consensus, at 6-0% p.a.  over the next 5yr 

In 2016 in the United States, it generated $6 billion of revenue 
and in Europe, it generated €14 bn in revenues.

Manufacturing

Bicycle manufacturers

Bicycle component manufacturers

Distribution

Bicycle and component distributors
Bicycle Technologies International
Quality Bicycle Products

Local bicycle and component retailers

Services and events

Touring

Racing

Trade
 Interbike
 Frostbike
 Eurobike

Advocacy

Besides advocating for greater safety, comfort, and convenience for bicyclists, many members of the industry promote bicycles for poverty alleviation. Experiments done in Africa (Uganda and Tanzania) and Sri Lanka on hundreds of households have shown that a bicycle can increase the income of a poor family by as much as 35%. Transport, if analyzed for the cost-benefit analysis for rural poverty alleviation, has given one of the best returns in this regard. For example, road investments in India were a staggering 3-10 times more effective than almost all other investments and subsidies in rural economy in the decade of the 1990s. What a road does at a macro level to increase transport, the bicycle supports at the micro level. The bicycle, in that sense, can be one of the best means to eradicate poverty in poor nations.

World Bicycle Relief, which specializes in large-scale, comprehensive bicycle distribution programs to aid poverty relief and disaster recovery initiatives in developing countries around the world, includes among its sponsors such notable companies as Accell Group, Bicycle Technologies International, Giant Bicycles, GT Bicycles, Quality Bicycle Products, Shimano, SRAM Corporation, Specialized Bicycle Components, and Trek Bicycle Corporation.

Publications
Notable publications about bicycles and cycling include:
Bicycle Quarterly
Bicycling

See also
French bicycle industry
List of bicycle manufacturers
List of bicycle part manufacturers
Local bike shop

References

External links
  Bicycle trade news US point of view
  Bicycle trade news UK point of view

 
Industries (economics)